Carlos Alberto Urán (born January 6, 1980 in Urrao, Colombia) is a Colombian cyclist riding for Team Manzana Postobón.

Palmares
2008
1st team pursuit, Pan American Road and Track Championships
1st omnium, Pan American Road and Track Championships
3rd scratch, Pan American Road and Track Championships
2010
1st omnium, Pan American Road and Track Championships
1st omnium, South American Games
2011
1st scratch, Pan American Road and Track Championships
3rd omnium, Pan American Road and Track Championships
2012
1st stage 1 Vuelta a Colombia

References
 

1980 births
Living people
Colombian male cyclists
South American Games gold medalists for Colombia
South American Games medalists in cycling
Competitors at the 2010 South American Games
Sportspeople from Antioquia Department
21st-century Colombian people